Jevgenija Lisicina, also spelled Eugenia Lissitsyna or Jewgenia Lisitzina (born on November 11, 1942 in Stupino, Russia) is a Latvian organist of Russian descent.

Biography 

Jevgenija Lisicina was born in Stupino, near Moscow, in a family descended from Tula armourers, grew up in the Urals. Her father passionately wished a musician's career for his daughter. She herself dreamed of playing organ music, and a pipe organ seemed to her a mystical instrument for the chosen ones.

Having finished a school of music in Yekaterinburg, Jevgenia admissed the piano faculty of the St. Petersburg Conservatory, class of Prof. Vladimir Nielsen. Once organist Mark Shakhin took the new student with him to a concert in Riga. There, Jevgenija heard the Riga Cathedral organ and got acquainted with the patriarch of Latvian organists – Nikolajs Vanadziņš, her future professor. Jevgenija left piano studies in St. Petersburg and admissed to the Nikolajs Vanadziņš class at the Jāzeps Vītols Latvian Academy of Music.

Being a student, she performed more than 40 concerts as well as recorded a solo record, and was awarded the Tchaikovsky's scholarship. In 1968 Jevgenija Lisicina became a laureate of Čiurlionis International Competition of Organists (Vilnius, Lithuania).

After graduation from the Academy of Music Jevgenia performed more than a thousand concerts worldwide.

In 1989/90 questioning of the readers of the major newspaper Komsomolskaya Pravda ranked two records by Jevgenija Lisicina in the top ten most popular classical music records in the Soviet Union.

Thus, Jevgenija Lisicina linked her life with the mighty building of the Riga Dome Cathedral and its major organ where she has been cherishing the dream of playing in the Riga Cathedral all Bach's works composed for the organ in one musical project. She succeeded at last in making her dreams come true in 1999–2001. She devoted the project to the 315th anniversary of Bach and the 800th anniversary of Riga. By the way, she does not think she belongs to any school of organ music: “For me, there exists just one school – that of Johann Sebastian Bach”.

In 2002 Jevgenija Lisicina mastered another musical project devoted to the 110th anniversary of her teacher Prof. N.Vanadzins. There were 9 concert programs in the project including masterpieces by Bach, Vivaldi, Reger, Franck, the works by French, Russian and Latvian composers and Bach's Musikalisches Opferas.

On April 27, 1995 Parliament of Latvia awarded Jevgenija Lisicina with Latvian citizenship for special merits and contribution to the culture of Latvia.

Awards 

 Laureate of Čiurlionis International Competition of Organists  (Lithuania, 1968).

Works 

Jevgenija Lisicina is the author of several transcriptions of classical music for organ performance. Among them are:

 Antonio Vivaldi – Gloria for choir and orchestra* Antonio Vivaldi – The Four Seasons for organ'''
 Modest Mussorgsky – Pictures from Exhibition for organ and piano
 Modest Mussorgsky – Pictures from Exhibition for organ and percussions
 Alfred Schnittke – Ancient Suite for organ
 Jāzeps Vītols – The Bard of Beverina for organ
 Francis Poulenc – Concerto en sol mineur for organ and piano
 Samuel Barber – Adagio for Strings for organ
 Edvard Grieg – Introduction for “Peer Gynt” for organ and piano
 Maurice Ravel – Pavana for organ and piano

Other transcriptions include classical music of J.S.Bach and L.V.Beethoven.

 Major projects 
 1999–2001  The 16 concert project at the Riga Cathedral "The Entire Bach"'' devoted to the 315th anniversary of Bach and the 800-year anniversary of Riga. Concert programmes included all masterpieces by Johan Sebastian Bach ever written for pipe organ.
 2002 The nine concert project at the Riga Cathedral dedicated to the 110th anniversary of Prof. N.Vanadzins. Concert programmes included masterpieces by Bach, Vivaldi, Reger, Franck, the works by French, Russian and Latvian composers and Bach's Musikalisches Opferas.

Recordings 

Since early in her career, Jevgenija Lisicina has recorded dozens of organ music solo recordings in the Riga Dom Cathedral (Latvia). Today her recordings include twenty+ LP records and eight CDs.

References

External links 
 Jevgenija Lisicina on Hermana Brauna Foundation web
 
 Jevgenija Lisicina updates on Twitter

1942 births
Living people
Latvian organists
Musicians from Moscow
21st-century organists
Latvian people of Russian descent
Soviet emigrants to Latvia